Athletic Club Femenino is the women's football section of Athletic Bilbao, competing in Liga F. Athletic is one of the most successful women's teams in Spain, with five championships. Just as with the men's team, their official policy is to sign players native to or trained in football in the greater Basque Country. The team plays at the club's facilities in Lezama on the outskirts of Bilbao.

History
The team was founded in 2000 as Leioa EFT after CD Sondika disbanded its women's team, which had played in the defunct División de Honor in the 1990s. After Leioa gained promotion to the new Superliga Femenina in just two years, it was absorbed by Athletic Bilbao. At that time a reserve team, Athletic B, was also introduced – they currently compete in Group 2 of the Segunda División, the regionalised second tier.

In their debut season Athletic won the championship, and successfully defended the title in the next two seasons, becoming the first team to be awarded the trophy to keep permanently. After a disappointing 2006 season, Athletic won its fourth title in 2007. As a result of their title wins they made four appearances in the UEFA Women's Cup, being knocked out in the group stages by 1. FFC Frankfurt in 2004, Djurgårdens IF in 2005, SV Saestum in 2006 and ASDCF Bardolino in 2008.

Athletic finished third in the next four championships between 2008 and 2011. In 2012 they were runners-up, and reached the Copa de la Reina final for the first time, losing to RCD Espanyol after extra time. On 5 January 2013 the team celebrated its tenth anniversary, beating Arsenal LFC in a friendly match. They were cup runners-up again in 2014, this time losing on penalties to FC Barcelona, having finished second behind the same club in the league.

On 5 June 2016, Athletic won its fifth league title, nine years after its last success. They competed in the UEFA Women's Champions League the following season, where they were eliminated by Danish champions Fortuna Hjorring in the Round of 32.

In June 2017, the club announced they would introduce a second reserve team for the coming season, made up of girls aged 13 to 15. Later that year, a club proposal to enter another girls team (12/13 years) into a local boys' youth league was rejected by the provincial council.

In January 2019, the club broke the European record for attendance at a women's football match with 48,121 spectators at San Mamés for a Copa de la Reina quarter-final fixture, a 2–0 loss to Atlético Madrid. (however, it only stood for a few months until Barcelona played Atlético in front of a 60,739 crowd). That match was the 14th played by the women's team in the two versions of the club's main stadium since the first in 2003, with three more played there during the next year.

Season to season

As Leioa EFT

As Athletic Bilbao

Honours

Titles

Official competitions
Primera División (5): 2002–03, 2003–04, 2004–05, 2006–07, 2015–16
Euskal Herria Cup (7): 2011, 2013, 2014, 2015, 2016, 2017, 2018

Invitational competitions
Sport Mundi Tournament (4): 2006, 2007, 2011, 2012
COTIF: 2015
Teresa Herrera Trophy: 2017, 2018
Ramón de Carranza Trophy: 2019

UEFA competition record

Players

Current squad
As of 8 September 2022

Out on Loan

Reserve team

Former players
For details of current and former players, see :Category:Athletic Bilbao (women) players.

See also
 Athletic–Barcelona rivalry
 Women's Basque derby

References

External links

 UEFA profile
Athletic Club at Txapeldunak
From official website:
 Team history
 Appearances
 Goalscorers
 A-Z of players 
 Debuts

 
Women's football clubs in Spain
Athletic Bilbao
2002 establishments in Spain
Primera División (women) clubs
Football clubs in the Basque Country (autonomous community)
Association football clubs established in 2002